Curraweela is a locality in the Upper Lachlan Shire, New South Wales, Australia. It had a school from 1878 to 1900, which was variously designated as a "half-time", "provisional" and "house to house" school.

References

Upper Lachlan Shire
Localities in New South Wales